Magisk can refer to:
 Magisk (software), an Android application
 Magisk (gamer), a professional Counter-Strike: Global Offensive player